Igor Ivanov (born 26 October 1970) is a Russian ice hockey player. He competed in the men's tournament at the 1994 Winter Olympics.

Career statistics

Regular season and playoffs

International

References

1970 births
Living people
Soviet ice hockey players
Olympic ice hockey players of Russia
Ice hockey players at the 1994 Winter Olympics
Ice hockey people from Moscow